The dram (alternative British spelling drachm; apothecary symbol ʒ or ℨ; abbreviated dr) is a unit of mass in the avoirdupois system, and both a unit of mass and a unit of volume in the apothecaries' system. It was originally both a coin and a weight in ancient Greece. The unit of volume is more correctly called a fluid dram, fluid drachm, fluidram or fluidrachm (abbreviated fl dr, ƒ 3, or fʒ).

Ancient unit of mass

The Attic Greek drachma was a weight of 6 obols,  Greek mina, or about 4.37 grams.
 The Roman drachma was a weight of  Roman pounds, or about 3.41 grams.
A coin weighing one drachma is known as a stater, drachm, or drachma. The Ottoman dirhem was based on the Sassanian drachm, which was itself based on the Roman dram/drachm.

British unit of mass
The British Weights and Measures Act of 1878 introduced verification and consequent stamping of apothecary weights, making them officially recognized units of measurement. By 1900, Britain had enforced the distinction between the avoirdupois and apothecaries' versions by making the spelling different:
An ounce consisted of 437.5 grains, thus making the dram approximately 27.34 grains.

Modern unit of mass
In the avoirdupois system, the dram is the mass of  pound or  ounce. The dram weighs  grains, or exactly  grams.

In the apothecaries' system, which was widely used in the United States until the middle of the 20th century, the dram is the mass of  pounds apothecaries (lb ap), or  ounces apothecaries (oz ap or ℥) (the pound apothecaries and ounce apothecaries are equal to the troy pound (lb t), and troy ounce (oz t), respectively).

"Dram" is also used as a measure of the powder charge in a shotgun shell, representing the equivalent of black powder in drams avoirdupois.

Unit of volume

  in the U.S. customary system
  in the British Imperial system

A teaspoonful has been considered equal to one fluid dram for medical prescriptions. However, by 1876 the teaspoon had grown considerably larger than it was previously, measuring 80–85 minims. As there are 60 minims in a fluid dram, using this equivalent for the dosage of medicine was no longer suitable. Today's US teaspoon is equivalent to exactly 4.92892159375 ml, which is also  US fluid ounces,  US fluid drams, or 80 US minims.

While pharmaceuticals are measured nowadays exclusively in metric units, fluid drams are still used to measure the capacity of pill containers.

Dram is used informally to mean a small amount of spirituous liquor, especially Scotch whisky. The unit is referenced by the phrase dram shop, the U.S. legal term for an establishment that serves alcoholic beverages.

In popular culture
The line "Where'd you get your whiskey, where'd you get your dram?" appears in some versions of the traditional pre–Civil War American song "Cindy".  In the Monty Python's song "The Bruces' Philosophers Song", there is the line "Hobbes was fond of his dram". In the old-time music tradition of the United States, there is a tune entitled "Gie the Fiddler a Dram", "gie" being the Scots language word for "give", brought over by immigrants and commonly used by their descendants in Appalachia at the time of writing.

In the episode "Double Indecency"  of the TV series Archer, the character Cheryl/Carol was carrying around 10 drams of Vole's blood and even offered to pay for a taxi ride with it.

In Frank Herbert's Dune, the Fremen employ a sophisticated measurement system that involves the drachm (and fractions thereof) to accurately count and economize water, an ultra-precious resource on their home, the desert planet Arrakis.

References

External links

 Appendix C – General Tables of Units of Measurement in Specifications, Tolerances, and Other Technical Requirements for Weighing and Measuring Devices. NIST Handbook 44 (2012 ed.).
 Image  of Ancient Greek silver drachm with flying Pegasus, Acarnania, Leucas, c. 470–450 BCE

Units of mass
Units of volume
Imperial units
Customary units of measurement in the United States
Alcohol measurement
Cooking weights and measures